Aeschlimann is a Swiss German surname. Notable people with the surname include:

 Charles Aeschlimann (1897–1952), Swiss tennis player
 Georges Aeschlimann (1920–2010), Swiss cyclist
 Jean-Jacques Aeschlimann (born 1967), Swiss ice hockey player
 Karl Eduard Aeschlimann (1808–1893), Swiss architect
 Manuel Aeschlimann (born 1964), French politician
 Martin Aeschlimann (born 1957), German physicist
 Peter Aeschlimann (born 1946), Swiss ice hockey player
 Roger Aeschlimann (1923–2008), Swiss cyclist

References 

German-language surnames
Swiss-German surnames

de:Aeschlimann